David Belenguer Reverte (born 17 December 1972) is a Spanish former footballer who played as a central defender.

During his extensive professional career, he was mainly associated with Getafe – where he arrived already in his 30s – helping the club consolidate in La Liga. Both major levels of Spanish football combined, he appeared in 441 matches over 18 seasons.

Club career
Born in Vilassar de Mar, Barcelona, Catalonia, Belenguer grew in the ranks of Real Madrid and played in a host of second division clubs before finally settling at Real Betis in 2000–01, achieving La Liga promotion that season. He previously made his debut in the competition on 30 August 1998 with CF Extremadura, in a 0–0 home draw against Real Valladolid– the former would be relegated, with the player appearing in 36 games.

In January 2004, Belenguer joined Madrid's Getafe CF, also promoting from the second tier at the end of the campaign. He went on to become an essential member of a side that consolidated their top-flight status (he scored his first league goal on 18 September 2005 in a 4–3 away victory over Deportivo Alavés), while also contributing ten appearances and one goal as the team reached the quarter-finals in the 2007–08 edition of the UEFA Cup.

Belenguer was sparingly used in his final two years, and left the Coliseum Alfonso Pérez at the end of 2009–10 after seeing out his contract. In his final season he played 13 matches, the last of which was a solid defensive performance at Atlético Madrid on 15 May 2010, as Getafe won 3–0 and clinched the sixth position at the expense of Villarreal CF, thus qualifying for the second time in the club's history for European competition.

In mid-July 2010, when retirement seemed like the most likely option, Belenguer returned to former side Betis after signing a one-year deal, five months short of his 38th birthday. Due to the many injuries that affected the back sector, he was able to appear in 20 league games as they returned to the top division after a two-year absence, as champions.

Belenguer became president of Portuguese club C.D. Tondela on 15 November 2018.

Honours
Betis
Segunda División: 2010–11

References

External links

1972 births
Living people
People from Vilassar de Mar
Sportspeople from the Province of Barcelona
Spanish footballers
Footballers from Catalonia
Association football defenders
La Liga players
Segunda División players
Tercera División players
Real Madrid C footballers
Palamós CF footballers
CD Leganés players
RC Celta de Vigo players
UE Lleida players
Albacete Balompié players
CF Extremadura footballers
Real Betis players
Getafe CF footballers
Catalonia international footballers
Spanish football chairmen and investors